The 2000–01 B Group was the 46th season of the Bulgarian B Football Group, the second tier of the Bulgarian football league system. A total of 18 teams contested the league, but three of them stopped participating during the season due to financial reasons.

Team changes

The following teams had changed division after the 1999–2000 season.

To B Group

From B Group

League table

Promotion play-off

Top scorers

References

2000-01
Bul
2